Khurram Shehzad may refer to:

 Khurram Shehzad (cricketer, born 1982), Pakistani cricketer
 Khurram Shehzad (politician) (born 1969), Pakistani politician

See also
 Khurram Shahzad (disambiguation)